Nili is a district in Daykundi province in central Afghanistan. The main town in the district, also called Nili, serves as the capital of Daykundi Province. The town of Nili has a small airport (heliport) with a gravel runway and a commercial radio station. The weather conditions in the winter are severe and the roads are difficult.

Nili district shares borders with volatile Gizab District, which was reported to have many Taliban insurgents roaming around. Beyond the provincial seat of Nili town, the other villages of Nili district are: Dasht, Sari Nili, Pai Nili, Ghudar, Qol Qadir, Qom Ahmad Baeg, Ijdi, Shish, Kohna Deyh and Sangmom.

Due to Nili's geographical inaccessibility and acute security problems, it was not until April 2007 that the United Nations opened an office in Nili of UNAMA (United Nations Assistance Mission in Afghanistan).

Profile 
District profile:

 Villages: 135
 Ethnic diversity: 100% Hazara.
 Schools: 15 primary, 3 secondary, 2 high schools.
 Health centers: 5.
 Main agricultural products: almond, apricot, maize, wheat.
 Primary handicrafts: embroidery, hat making, weaving.

Notable people 

 Azra Jafari, In December 2008-December 2013 Azra Jafari was named by Afghan President Hamid Karzai to be the mayor of Nili District, thus becoming Afghanistan's first female mayor.she was one of the successful mayors in Afghanistan.
 Muhammad Hussain Sadiqi Nili
 Nasrullah Sadiqi Zada Nili

See also 
 Districts of Afghanistan
 Nili, Afghanistan

References

External links 
 Summary of District Development Plan, 2007

Districts of Daykundi Province
Hazarajat